Brzeźno  is a village in the administrative district of Gmina Dorohusk, within Chełm County, Lublin Voivodeship, in eastern Poland, close to the border with Ukraine.

The village has a population of 1,200.

References

Villages in Chełm County